Barry Leibowitz (born September 10, 1945 in New York, New York) is a retired American-Israeli professional basketball player.

He played in the 1966 Pan American Maccabiah Games in Brazil. He played with, among others, Mark Turenshine and future NBA players Dave Newmark and Rick Weitzman.

A 6' 2" guard from Long Island University, Leibowitz played one season (1967–68) in the American Basketball Association (ABA) as a member of the Pittsburgh Pipers, New Jersey Americans and Oakland Oaks.

He later played professionally in Israel for Hapoel Tel Aviv from 1968 until 1982, and coached the team to the league and cup double in 1968-69. Leibowitz was the captain of Israeli national team that won the silver medal at EuroBasket 1979, and also participated at the 1973, 1975, 1977 and 1981 European championships.

References

External links

basketpedya.com

1945 births
Living people
21st-century American Jews
American men's basketball coaches
American men's basketball players
Basketball coaches from New York (state)
Basketball players from New York City
DeWitt Clinton High School alumni
Hapoel Tel Aviv B.C. players
Israeli basketball coaches
Israeli Jews
Israeli men's basketball players
Jewish American sportspeople
Jewish men's basketball players
LIU Brooklyn Blackbirds men's basketball players
Competitors at the 1977 Maccabiah Games
Maccabiah Games basketball players of Israel
Maccabiah Games silver medalists for Israel
New Jersey Americans players
New York Knicks draft picks
Oakland Oaks players
Pittsburgh Pipers players
Point guards
Shooting guards